The growth of human hair occurs everywhere on the body except for the soles of the feet, the inside of the mouth, the lips, the backs of the ears, the palms of the hands, some external genital areas, the navel, scar tissue, and, apart from eyelashes, the eyelids. Hair is a stratified squamous keratinized epithelium made of multi-layered flat cells whose rope-like filaments provide structure and strength to the hair shaft. The protein called keratin makes up hair and stimulates hair growth. Hair follows a specific growth cycle with three distinct and concurrent phases: anagen, catagen, and telogen. Each phase has specific characteristics that determine the length of the hair.

The body has different types of hair, including vellus hair and androgenic hair, each with its own type of cellular construction.  This varied construction gives the hair unique characteristics, serving specific purposes, mainly warmth (redundant in modern humans) and physical protection. Most humans develop the longest thickest hair on their scalps and (mostly observed in males) faces. This hair will usually grow to several feet before terminating, but many humans develop much longer hair.

Growth cycle

The three stages of hair growth are the anagen, catagen, and telogen phases. Each strand of hair on the human body is at its own stage of development. Once the cycle is complete, it restarts and a new strand of hair begins to form. The growth rate of hair varies from individual to individual depending on their age, genetic predisposition and a number of environmental factors. It is commonly stated that hair grows about 1 cm per month on average; however reality is more complex, since not all hair grows at once. Scalp hair was reported to grow between 0.6 cm and 3.36 cm per month. The growth rate of scalp hair somewhat depends on age (hair tends to grow more slowly with age), sex, and ethnicity. Thicker hair (>60 µm) grows generally faster (11.4 mm per month) than thinner (20-30 µm) hair (7.6 mm per month). 

It was previously thought that Caucasian hair grew more quickly than Asian hair and that the growth rate of women's hair was faster than that of men. However, more recent research has shown that the growth rate of hair in men and women does not significantly differ and that the hair of Chinese people grew more quickly than the hair of French Caucasians and West and Central Africans. The quantity of hair hovers in a certain range depending on hair colour. An average blonde person has 150,000 hairs, a brunette has 110,000, a black-haired person has 100,000, and a redhead has 90,000. Hair growth stops after a human's death. Visible growth of hair on the dead body happens only because of skin drying out due to water loss.

Anagen phase
The anagen phase, known as the growth phase, is when the hair physically grows approximately 1 cm per month. It begins in the papilla and can last from three to five years. The span at which the hair remains in this stage of growth is determined by genetics. The longer the hair stays in the anagen phase, the longer it will grow. During this phase, cells neighboring the papilla in a germinative layer divide to produce new hair fibers, and the follicle buries itself into the dermal layer of the skin to nourish the strand. About 85%–90% of the hairs on one's head are in the anagen phase at any given time.

Catagen phase
The catagen phase, or the transitional phase, allows the follicle to renew itself (in a sense). During this time, which lasts about two weeks, the hair follicle shrinks due to disintegration and the papilla detaches and "rests," cutting the hair strand off from its nourishing blood supply. Signals sent out by the body (that only selectively affect 1 percent of all hair of one's body at any given time) determine the end of melanin production in the hair bulb and apoptosis of follicular melanocytes. Ultimately, the follicle is 1/6 its original length, causing the hair shaft to be pushed upward.

Growth inhibitors and disorders

In most people, scalp hair growth will halt due to follicle devitalization after reaching a length of generally two or three feet. Exceptions to this rule can be observed in individuals with hair development abnormalities, which may cause an unusual length of hair growth.

Chemotherapy
Most chemotherapy drugs work by attacking rapidly dividing cells. Rapid cell replication is one of the hallmarks of cancer; however, hair follicle cells also grow and divide quickly. Consequently, the chemotherapy drugs usually inhibit hair growth.  The dose and type of medicine will determine the severity of hair loss. Once the course of chemotherapy has ended, new hair growth may begin after three to 10 weeks.

Hair loss

Alopecia is a hair loss disease that can occur in anyone at any stage of life. Specifically alopecia areata is an autoimmune disease that causes hair to spontaneously fall out. It is mainly characterized by bald patches on the scalp or other parts of the body, and can ultimately cause baldness across the entire body. This disease interferes with the hair growth cycle by causing a follicle to prematurely leave the anagen, or active growth, phase and enter the resting, or telogen, phase. The hair growth in the affected follicles is lessened or stopped completely.

Traction alopecia is caused by adding too much strain on the hair on one's head. Tight ponytails and other styles that require added tension to the hair are often what cause this disease. It can also occur on the face in areas where the hair is often styled. Plucking or waxing one's eyebrows frequently, for example, can yield suppressed hair growth in the area.

On the scalp, the hair is usually known to be lost around the hair line, leaving the densest amount of hair at the crown. Small vellus hair will often replace the hair that is lost.

Radiation therapy to the head
Human hair follicles are very sensitive to the effects of radiation therapy administered to the head, most commonly used to treat cancerous growths within the brain. Hair shedding may start as soon as two weeks after the first dose of radiation and will continue for a couple of weeks. Hair follicles typically enter the telogen phase, and regrowth should commence 2.5 to 3 months after the hair begins to shed. Regrowth may be sparser after treatment.

UV-B
Ultraviolet light levels of either 20 or 50 mJ cm−2 in the UV-B range have been shown to inhibit hair growth, reduce hair melanin and damage hair follicles.

See also
 Evolution of hair
Hair transplantation

References

Human hair